Madhosh may refer to:
Madhosh (1951 film), a 1951 Bollywood film
Madhosh (1974 film), a 1974 Bollywood film
Madhosh (1994 film), a 1994 Bollywood film
 Ahmad Khan Madhosh (1931-2010), Sindhi-language poet

See also
Madhoshi, a 2004 Bollywood film